The 2003 World Single Distance Speed Skating Championships were held 14–16 March 2003 in the Sportforum Hohenschönhausen, Berlin, Germany.

Schedule

Medal summary

Men's events

Women's events

Medal table

External links
 ISU Results

2003 World Single Distance
World Single Distance Speed Skating Championships
World Single Distance, 2003
Speed skating in Berlin
2003 in German sport
2003 in Berlin
World Single Distance Speed Skating Championships